The August Frank memorandum of 26 September 1942 was a directive from SS Lieutenant General August Frank of the SS concentration camp administration department (SS-WVHA).  The memorandum provides a measure of the detailed planning that Frank and other Nazis put into the carrying out of the Holocaust. It includes instructions as to the disposition of postage stamp collections and underwear of the murdered Jews. It is clear that the Nazis were intent in removing everything of value from their victims.

The memorandum contains an instruction that the yellow stars that the Nazis forced Jews to wear on their clothing were to be removed before the clothing was redistributed to ethnic Germans whom the Nazis were resettling into occupied Poland.  This memorandum, when it came to light after the war, played a key role in refuting Frank's claims that he had no knowledge that Jews were being murdered en masse in the extermination camps of Operation Reinhard.

Text of the memorandum 
The top secret memorandum, printed in multiple copies, was sent to the Chief of the SS Garrison Administration Lublin, and to the Chief of Administration Concentration Camp Auschwitz among others. English translation, provided by the Nuremberg Military Tribunal during the Trials of War Criminals:

Notes 

1942 documents
Holocaust historical documents
Nazi SS
Operation Reinhard
Planning the Holocaust
September 1942 events